Hollonville is located in unincorporated Pike County, Georgia, United States.

Hollonville is home to the Hollonville Opry House, Ferguson's Store, Hollonville Tire, Harp's Crossing Baptist Church at Hollonville, United Methodist Church of Hollonville, Smith Electric Contracting Inc and Gregg's Peach Orchard

Unincorporated communities in Pike County, Georgia
Unincorporated communities in Georgia (U.S. state)